Stone Creek may refer to:

 Stony Creek (Sacramento River tributary), California
 Stone Creek (New Jersey)
 Stone Creek, Ohio
 Stone Creek, Virginia
 Stone Creek Settlement, now Lost City, California
 Stone Creek Township, Bottineau County, North Dakota

See also
 Steinbach (disambiguation)
 Stoner Creek (disambiguation)
 Stoney Creek (disambiguation)